Do and Dare is a 1922 American silent Western film directed by Edward Sedgwick and starring Tom Mix, Dulcie Cooper and Claire Adams.

Cast
 Tom Mix as Kit Carson Boone / Henry Boone
 Dulcie Cooper as Mary Lee
 Claire Adams as Juanita Sánchez
 Claude Payton as Córdoba 
 Jack Rollens as José Sánchez
 Hector V. Sarno as General Sánchez 
 Wilbur Higby as Colonel 'Handy' Lee
 Robert Klein as Yellow Crow 
 Gretchen Hartman as Zita

References

Bibliography
 Connelly, Robert B. The Silents: Silent Feature Films, 1910-36, Volume 40, Issue 2. December Press, 1998.
 Munden, Kenneth White. The American Film Institute Catalog of Motion Pictures Produced in the United States, Part 1. University of California Press, 1997.
 Solomon, Aubrey. The Fox Film Corporation, 1915-1935: A History and Filmography. McFarland, 2011.

External links
 

1922 films
1922 Western (genre) films
1920s English-language films
American silent feature films
Silent American Western (genre) films
American black-and-white films
Fox Film films
Films directed by Edward Sedgwick
1920s American films